David V. Politzer (born 1976) was born in Washington, DC. He is a photographer and digital media artist living in Houston, Texas, where he is a member of the Art and Art History faculty at the University of Houston.

Education 
Politzer studied fine art photography in a Study Abroad Program at the Glasgow School of Art.
He studied at Skowhegan School of Painting and Sculpture and earned a BS in Art from Skidmore College and an MFA in Photography from Syracuse University, in Syracuse, New York.

Teaching 
He is an Associate Professor of Photography and Digital Media Program at the University of Houston.  He was Visiting Assistant Professor of Photography at Youngstown State University prior to going to Houston in 2010.

Artist in Residence 
In 2011 he held a position as artist in residence at the Lawndale Art Center and he held a 2017 summer residency at Artspace's Gallery One in Raleigh, North Carolina. He was also an artist in residence at Djerassi Artists Residency, Yaddo, Roswell Museum and Art Center, the Skowhegan School, and the Kala Art Institute. Politzer's Roswell residency is discussed in Jackie Battenfield's book "The Artist's Guide: How to Make a Living Doing What You Love".

Exhibitions and screenings 
His entry in the exhibition Here and Elsewhere at the Bronx Museum was described by The New York Times reviewer Martha Schwendener, "David Politzer's funny, smart work The Decider, includes two video monitors hung from a yoke on opposite sides of a weight bench. In one monitor Mr. Politzer is wearing a dress shirt and ruminating about how he can compete with businessmen and politicians like Donald Trump and Arnold Schwarzenegger. In the other Mr. Politzer speaks as an artist. Of his Lawnsdale show, critic Kelly Klaasmeyer described surreal parts of Politzer's installation, "His photographs capture views of "nature" that are decidedly unnatural"
and "Politzer really hones in on the weirdness in contemporary society relating to the natural world." Baltimore vs. the World, an exhibition at the Current Gallery in Baltimore, Maryland, explored the nature of video media. David Politzer's entry was one of the jury-selected videos described in the art critic Martin Johnson's review asserting that "The most charming video in the collection is David Politzer's "Rio Macho," one of a series of videos starring Politzer and his alter ego, who appears on a television set. Politzer explores real and mediated landscapes with his television in hand, which keeps alive the connection between video and the larger, more uncertain world of digital media." His show of photographs of behemoth pumpkins at the Houston Center for Photography and FotoFest was his introduction to the  UH fine arts faculty. In his loft north of Washington Avenue, he printed and framed "quasi-sensual photographs of giant pumpkins" in preparation for the show Nowhere Near Here: New Lens-based Work from Texas, the fourth in the Talent in Texas biennial series. Politzer showed 30 photos of pumpkins from his Heavyweights series, and this show was Houston's first look at his work.
David Politzer was the recipient of the 2011 Houston Center for Photography Carol Crow Fellowship Award. His work has been shown at Artspace in New Haven, Connecticut,Vox Populi (Philadelphia), Video Dumbo (Brooklyn), the Syracuse International Film Festival and in a solo exhibition at the Museum of Northern Arizona. In the Cleveland Plain Dealer, Steven Litt wrote that Politzer "employs video, photography, performance and sculpture to discuss how mass media representations further confuse the vagaries of contemporary social interaction. Specifically, he is interested in portrayals of masculinity on the big and small screens, and the expectations they create. He uses an intimate and straightforward approach along with humor to address such topics as relationships, body image and self-confidence." Politzer's participation in the show was a spoofing parody of a natural resources museum show. Part of Politzer's solo show TMI at Ten at the Ten Gallery in New Orleans featured a video, titled From the Rim, of a sequence of amateur videos of people arriving at and posing in front of the Grand Canyon. In 2016 Politzer and Bradly Brown showed video art together. In Only a Signal Shown, a show in 2013 curated by Michael Hall which included works by "artists performing ridiculous acts of endurance", Politzer introduced the audience to his new studio.

Solo exhibition venues include Artspace, where his art was available for viewing in Gallery One during a First Friday public event. Of the show Henry Fenn Is In the Bathroom Again based on the journeys of his great-great-grandfather to Lookout Mountain, Tennessee and the French Broad River in
Western North Carolina." Other solo show venues: Museum of Northern Arizona, Real Art Ways, Marshall Art Gallery at the Roswell Museum and Art Center and Lawndale Art Center. Group show and screening venues include the Bronx Museum of the Arts, New Mexico Museum of Art, The Soap Factory, Southern Exposure, Vox Populi, and Gallery Korea.

References

External links 
  David Politzer art.
 David Politzer in Muybridge's horse.
 "Dynamic Coupling", a Dialogue with Krista Birnbaum and David Politzer, Journal of the New Media Caucus, 2010.

Living people
American photographers
Skidmore College alumni
University of Houston faculty
1976 births